Cementland is an incomplete public art exhibit on the 54-acre site of a former cement factory just north of St. Louis, Missouri. The brainchild of sculptor Bob Cassilly, who also created St. Louis' City Museum, it contains giant concrete sculptures and obsolete machinery, and was planned to have navigable waterways, among many other features.

Much of the landscaping is built on dirt dumped by local construction companies, who used the land as a dump before Cassilly purchased it and who paid him for the privilege. Cassily was funding the construction of Cementland himself; the free material and income from the dumping helps underwrite what he said would "otherwise be an unaffordable project."

The site, outside the city boundaries in the village of Riverview, provides a view of the Gateway Arch. “In the afternoon, when the sun shines on the city, you get this nice reflection. You don’t see all the trash and stuff. It’s the best view of the city,” Cassilly said.

On September 26, 2011, Cassilly was killed at the Cementland site, and it initially was reported that he died when the bulldozer he was driving flipped down a hill. However, in October 2016, medical expert Dr. Arthur Combs concluded that Cassilly had been beaten to death, and the bulldozer accident staged.

The Cassilly family said that they had hopes to continue construction on the project, but in 2022 they sold the site at auction for $785,000. St. Louis photographer Richard Sprengeler has extensively photographed the site as part of a 2022 series.

References

External links
 Official site: Cementland
 Article and photos of the project
 Photos

Museums in St. Louis
Art museums and galleries in Missouri
Sculpture gardens, trails and parks in the United States
Proposed museums in the United States